The Fédération nationale des syndicats d'exploitants agricoles (English: National Federation of Agricultural Holders' Unions) is a French umbrella organisation charged with the national representation of 20,000 local agricultural unions and 22 regional federations.

Establishment
The Vichy regime's Peasant Corporation was dissolved after the Liberation of France in September 1944, but the unity of agricultural organisations that it had established persisted.

The new Socialist Minister of Agriculture, François Tanguy-Prigent, replaced it with a national union of working farmers rather than landowners, the General Confederation of Agriculture (GCA).

In March 1946 the CGA became the Fédération nationale des syndicats d'exploitants agricoles (FNSEA).
Many of the former Peasant Corporation leaders became leaders of the FNSEA.

References

Sources

External links 
 Official FNSEA website

Trade associations based in France